Between Us is the third studio album by Indonesian-Filipina singer Lala.

Track listing

Release history

References

2013 albums
Lala Karmela albums